Dirk Hilbert is a German politician serving as the current Lord Mayor of Dresden, the capital city of Saxony, since Helma Orosz's resignation in 2015.

Early life and career 
Hilbert studied industrial engineering at the Technical University of Dresden from 1992, and graduated in 1998 with a degree. From 1998 to 2000 he worked as a board assistant at the German Aerospace Center in Cologne, then in risk management at CargoLifter in Krausnick-Groß Wasserburg.

Political career 
From December 2008, Hilbert served as the Deputy Mayor of Lord Mayor Helma Orosz, and took over for her duties from February 2011 to March 1, 2012 due to the Mayor's illness. He became Lord Mayor upon Orosz's resignation in 2015.

Other activities 
 Max Planck Institute for Chemical Physics of Solids, Member of the Board of Trustees
 Max Planck Institute of Molecular Cell Biology and Genetics, Member of the Board of Trustees
 Max Planck Institute for the Physics of Complex Systems, Member of the Board of Trustees

References 

Mayors of Dresden
People from Saxony
Free Democratic Party (Germany) politicians
1971 births
Living people